Jared A. Ball (born 1971 in Washington, D.C.) is a professor of communication studies at Morgan State University in Baltimore, Maryland, United States. Additionally, he is an author, radio host and mixtape radio producer. In the 2008 presidential election, Ball sought the nomination of the Green Party of the United States before eventually dropping out and endorsing Congresswoman Cynthia McKinney.

Education and career
Ball is a graduate of the University of Maryland at College Park, the Cornell Africana Studies and Research Center at Cornell University and Frostburg State University. Ball is the author of The Myth and Propaganda of Black Buying Power (Palgrave Macmillan, 2020),  I Mix What I Like! A Mixtape Manifesto and co-editor of  A Lie of Reinvention: Correcting Manning Marable's Malcolm X, a critique of Manning Marable's Malcolm X: A Life of Reinvention.  He has also been known for his work on Pacifica Radio, Black Agenda Report and iMiXWHATiLiKE.ORG.

References

External links

Ball's faculty page at Morgan State University

1971 births
21st-century American politicians
Activists for African-American civil rights
African-American academics
African-American non-fiction writers
American non-fiction writers
African-American candidates for President of the United States
American radio hosts
Cornell University alumni
Frostburg State University alumni
Living people
Maryland Greens
Morgan State University faculty
Candidates in the 2008 United States presidential election
University of Maryland, College Park alumni
21st-century African-American politicians
20th-century African-American people